Self Made Vol. 2 is the second compilation album by MMG. The album was released on June 26, 2012, by Maybach Music Group, Warner Bros. Records and Def Jam Recordings. Like the previous album, Self Made Vol. 2 features contributions from members signed to the MMG label including Rick Ross, Wale, Meek Mill, Stalley, French Montana and Omarion along with Gunplay of Triple C's.

The album features guest appearances from Kendrick Lamar, Nas, Nipsey Hussle, Wiz Khalifa, Roscoe Dash, T-Pain, Ace Hood, Bun B & T.I. Producers on the album include Boi-1da, Don Cannon, Cardiak, Lee Major, The Beat Bully, and many more.

Singles
The first official single "Bag Of Money", featuring Wale, Rick Ross, Meek Mill, and T-Pain, was released on April 3, 2012. On May 2, 2012, the music video was released for "Bag of Money" featuring Wale Rick Ross, Meek Mill, and T-Pain. On May 23, 2012, the music video was released for "Let's Talk" featuring Omarion and Rick Ross. On June 26, 2012, the music video was released for "Black Magic" featuring Meek Mill and Rick Ross. On June 26, 2012, the music video was released for "Power Circle" featuring Rick Ross, Gunplay, Stalley, Wale, Meek Mill and Kendrick Lamar. On July 2, 2012, the music video was released for "Actin Up"  featuring Meek Mill, Wale and French Montana. On October 1, 2012, the music video was released for "Fountain of Youth" featuring Stalley, Rick Ross Nipsey Hussle. On October 3, 2012, the music video was released for "Bury Me a G" featuring T.I. and Rick Ross. On November 12, 2012, the music video was released for On November 23, 2012, the music video was released for "M.I.A." featuring Omarion and Wale. On November 20, 2012, the music video was released for "All Birds" featuring Rick Ross and French Montana.

Critical reception

Self Made Vol. 2 received generally positive reviews from music critics. At Metacritic, which assigns a normalized rating out of 100 to reviews from critics, the album received an average score of 70, which indicates "generally favorable reviews", based on 8 reviews. Carl Chery of XXL commended the performers' chemistry and stated, "There’s a clear hierarchy in song quality throughout the album, but no skip-worthy cuts." AllMusic editor David Jeffries called the album "an interesting mix of in-house and all-star, and another reason to take Ross the ring-leader seriously." However, Brandon Soderberg of Spin called them a "pseudo-supergroup of convenience" who "snarls, stunts, and simps luxuriously", and quipped, "needs more Gunplay." Roman Cooper of HipHopDX said, "Self Made Vol. 2 is a noted improvement from its predecessor. Aside from Rick Ross’ innate ability to choose great production and guest features, the project features Ross’ vision for his Maybach Music Group squad: a diverse collection of individuals whose differences are complementary. If the crew can manage to keep from occasionally lapsing into predictability, it'll be a force to be reckoned with for quite some time."

Commercial performance
The album debuted at number four on the Billboard 200 with first-week sales of 98,000 copies.

Track listing

Sample credits
 Track eleven, "Let's Talk", contains elements of "Big Poppa" by The Notorious B.I.G. It also interpolates the chorus of "Let's Talk About Sex" by Salt-n-Pepa.

Charts

Weekly charts

Year-end charts

Release history

References

2012 compilation albums
Rick Ross albums
Wale (rapper) compilation albums
Omarion albums
Meek Mill albums
Record label compilation albums
Def Jam Recordings compilation albums
Warner Records compilation albums
Albums produced by Bangladesh (record producer)
Albums produced by Boi-1da
Albums produced by Don Cannon
Albums produced by Drumma Boy
Albums produced by Lex Luger
Albums produced by Rico Love
Maybach Music Group albums
Hip hop compilation albums
Albums produced by Harry Fraud
Albums produced by the Inkredibles
Albums produced by Southside (record producer)
Sequel albums
Albums produced by Cardiak